Imagine is a 2012 album by Hong Kong musician Janice Vidal.

Track listing 
 街燈晚餐 "Streetlight Dinner"
 他不慣被愛 "He Didn't Used to Be Loved"
 我懷念的你 "I Miss You"
 愛沒有假如 "If Love Is Not"
 我們的故事 "Our Story"
 難為自己 "Make Life Difficult for Themselves"
 珍妮絲的告白 "Janice's Confession"
 回電我 "Call Me"
 只要我們還有心 "As Long As We Have a Heart"
 "Imagine"

External links 
 A music

2012 albums
Janice Vidal albums